This is a list of rural localities in Udmurtia. Udmurtia, or the Udmurt Republic, is a federal subject of Russia (a republic) within the Volga Federal District. Its capital is the city of Izhevsk. Population: 1,521,420 (2010 Census).

Alnashsky District 
Rural localities in Alnashsky District:

 Abyshevo
 Alnashi

Balezinsky District 
Rural localities in Balezinsky District:

 1205 km
 1214 km
 Balezino

Debyossky District 
Rural localities in Debyossky District:

 Debyosy

Grakhovsky District 
Rural localities in Grakhovsky District:

 Grakhovo

Igrinsky District 
Rural localities in Igrinsky District:

 Igra

Karakulinsky District 
Rural localities in Karakulinsky District:

 Karakulino

Kezsky District 
Rural localities in Kezsky District:

 Kez

Kiyasovsky District 
Rural localities in Kiyasovsky District:

 Kiyasovo

Kiznersky District 
Rural localities in Kiznersky District:

 Kizner

Krasnogorsky District 
Rural localities in Krasnogorsky District:

 Krasnogorskoye

Malopurginsky District 
Rural localities in Malopurginsky District:

 Buranovo
 Malaya Purga

Sarapulsky District 
Rural localities in Sarapulsky District:

 Sigayevo

Seltinsky District 
Rural localities in Seltinsky District:

 Selty

Sharkansky District 
Rural localities in Sharkansky District:

 Sharkan

Syumsinsky District 
Rural localities in Syumsinsky District:

 Syumsi

Uvinsky District 
Rural localities in Uvinsky District:

 Uva

Vavozhsky District 
Rural localities in Vavozhsky District:

 Vavozh

Yakshur-Bodyinsky District 
Rural localities in Yakshur-Bodyinsky District:

 Chur
 Yakshur-Bodya

Yukamensky District 
Rural localities in Yukamensky District:

 Yukamenskoye

Zavyalovsky District 
Rural localities in Zavyalovsky District:

 Senteg
 Zavyalovo

See also 
 
 Lists of rural localities in Russia

References 

Udmurtia